Collateral ligament of thumb may refer to:

 Ulnar collateral ligament of thumb
 Radial collateral ligament of thumb